The Avantha Masters was a professional golf tournament co-sanctioned by the European Tour, Asian Tour and the Professional Golf Tour of India. The tournament was played at the DLF Golf and Country Club in Delhi from 2010 to 2012 and moved to Jaypee Greens Golf Club, Greater Noida in 2013.

The event was tri-sanctioned by the European Tour, the Asian Tour and the Professional Golf Tour of India (PGTI). The 2011 Avantha Masters carried an increased prize fund of €1.8 million.

On 5 September 2013, the tournament's sponsor, Avantha Group, announced it had decided against renewing the contract with the  European Tour because of current economic conditions. With the announcement, the Avantha Masters was removed from the 2014 calendar of its three sanctioning Tours.

Winners

See also
Indian Masters, another co-sanctioned event in India, played in 2008, considered the same tournament as the Avantha Masters by the European Tour but not by the Asian Tour

Notes

References

External links
Coverage on the European Tour's official site
Coverage on the Asian Tour's official site

Former Asian Tour events
Former European Tour events
Golf tournaments in India
Recurring sporting events established in 2010
Recurring sporting events disestablished in 2013
2010 establishments in Uttar Pradesh
2013 disestablishments in India

de:Avantha Masters
nl:Indian Masters